Colquiri is a town in the La Paz Department in Bolivia. It is the seat of the Colquiri Municipality, the fourth municipal section of the Inquisivi Province.

References

External links 
Detailed map of Inquisivi Province
Map of Municipality

Populated places in La Paz Department (Bolivia)